Raleigh was an electoral district of the Legislative Assembly in the Australian state of New South Wales, originally created in 1894, partly replacing Macleay, and named after Raleigh County. In 1920, with the introduction of proportional representation, it was absorbed into Oxley, along with Gloucester. It was recreated in 1927 and abolished in 1981 and partly replaced by Coffs Harbour.

Members for Raleigh

Election results

References

Former electoral districts of New South Wales
Constituencies established in 1894
1894 establishments in Australia
Constituencies disestablished in 1904
1904 disestablishments in Australia